René Schérer (25 November 1922 – 1 February 2023) was a French philosopher and professor emeritus of the universite de Paris VIII.

Biography 
Schérer was born in Tulle on 25 November 1922. He is the younger brother of filmmaker Éric Rohmer (1920–2010). He was Guy Hocquenghem's teacher and lover, with whom he co-wrote two books. In 2007, then aged 85, he commented on the history of his life and his work in an interview with Geoffroy de Lagasnerie: After all: interviews on an intellectual life, published by Cartouche.

Schérer died in Châtillon, Hauts-de-Seine on 1 February 2023, at the age of 100.

Books 
 Husserl, sa vie, son œuvre (avec Arion Lothar Kelkel), Paris, PUF, 1964, coll. « Philosophes »
 Structure et fondement de la communication humaine, Paris, SEDES, 1966
 La Phénoménologie des « Recherches logiques » de Husserl, Paris, PUF, 1967
 Charles Fourier ou la Contestation globale, Paris, Seghers, 1970; réédition Paris, Séguier, 1996
 Philosophies de la communication, SEES, 1971
 Heidegger ou l'expérience de la pensée (avec Arion Lothar Kelkel), Paris, Seghers, 1973
 Émile perverti ou Des rapports entre l'éducation et la sexualité, Paris, Laffont, 1974 ; rééd. Désordres-Laurence Viallet, 2006
 Co-Ire : album systématique de l'enfance (avec Guy Hocquenghem), revue Recherches, 22, 1976
Le Corps interdit (en collaboration avec Georges Lapassade), E.S.F., 1977
 Une érotique puérile, Paris, Galilée, 1978
 L'Emprise. Des enfants entre nous, Paris, Hachette, 1979
 L'Âme atomique. Pour une esthétique d'ère nucléaire (avec Guy Hocquenghem), Paris, Albin Michel, 1986
 Pari sur l'impossible. Études fouriéristes, Saint-Denis, Presses universitaires de Vincennes, 1989
 Zeus hospitalier. Éloge de l'hospitalité, Paris, Armand Colin, 1993 ; rééd., Paris, La Table ronde, 2005
 Utopies nomades. En attendant 2002, Paris, Séguier, 1998 ; rééd., Les presses du réel, 2009
 Regards sur Deleuze, Paris, Kimé, 1998
 Un parcours critique : 1957–2000, Paris, Kimé, 2000
 L'Écosophie de Charles Fourier, Paris, Economica, 2001
 Enfantines, Paris, Anthropos, 2002
 Hospitalités, Paris, Anthropos, 2004
 Passages pasoliniens (avec Giorgio Passerone), Villeneuve-d'Ascq, Presses universitaires du Septentrion, 2006
 Après tout. Entretiens sur une vie intellectuelle (avec Geoffroy de Lagasnerie), Paris, Cartouche, 2007
 Pour un nouvel anarchisme, Paris, Cartouche, 2008
 Nourritures anarchistes. L'anarchisme explosé, Paris, Hermann, 2009
 Petit alphabet impertinent, Paris, Hermann, coll. « Hermann Philosophie », 2014
 En quête de réel. Réflexions sur le droit de punir, le fouriérisme et quelques autres thèmes – Entretien avec Tony Ferri, Paris, L'Harmattan, 2014
 Fouriériste aujourd'hui, suivi de Études et témoignages, sous la dir. de Yannick Beaubatie, Tulle, Éditions Mille Sources, 2017

Editions 
 Edmund Husserl, Recherches logiques (traduction et présentation, avec Hubert Elie et Ariel Lothar Kelkel), Paris, PUF, 4 vol., 1958-1963
 Charles Fourier, Charles Fourier, l'attraction passionnée (choix de textes et présentation), Paris, J.-J. Pauvert, 1967
 Charles Fourier, L'ordre subversif. Trois textes sur la civilisation (préface de René Schérer, postface de Jean Goret), Paris, Aubier, 1972
 Fous d'enfance : qui a peur des pédophiles ? (avec plusieurs contributeurs dont Jean Danet, Luc Rosenzweig, André Dumargue, Bernard Faucon, Jean-Luc Hennig, Guy Hocquenghem, Gabriel Matzneff, Jean-Jacques Passay, Gilbert Villerot), Revue Recherches, n° 37, 1979
Guy Hocquenghem, L'Amphithéâtre des morts, mémoires anticipées (postface), Éditions Gallimard, 1994 (posthume)
 Gabriel Tarde, Fragments d'histoire future (préface), Paris, Séguier, 1998
 Gabriel Tarde, La Logique sociale (préface), Le Plessis-Robinson, Institut Synthélabo pour le progrès de la connaissance, 1999, coll. « Les Empêcheurs de penser en rond »
Charles Fourier, Vers une enfance majeure, textes sur l'éducation réunis et présentés par René Schérer, Paris, La Fabrique, 2006
Guy Hocquenghem, La Beauté du métis : réflexions d'un francophobe, Paris, Ramsay, 1979, réédité en 2015 par les éditions Serge Safran, avec une préface de René Schérer
Guy Hocquenghem, Race d'Ep ! : un siècle d'images de l'homosexualité, 1979, réédité, en 2018, par les Éditions la Tempête, avec une préface de René Schérer

References

1922 births
2023 deaths
20th-century French philosophers
Academic staff of Paris 8 University Vincennes-Saint-Denis
French centenarians
French historians of philosophy
French LGBT rights activists
École Normale Supérieure alumni
Heidegger scholars
Men centenarians
People from Tulle